The 1916 Santa Clara Broncos football team represented Santa Clara University as an independent during the 1916 college football season In their first and only season under head coach Charles A. Austin, the team compiled a 10–0 record, shut out seven of its opponents, and outscored all opponents by a total of 318 to 13. In keeping with West Coast practice during the 1910s, the team played principally under rugby rules rather than American football rules.

The season ended on November 11 with a match between undefeated Santa Clara and undefeated Stanford; Santa Clara won convincingly by a 28–5 score at Ewing Field in San Francisco.

Schedule

References

Santa Clara
Santa Clara Broncos football seasons
College football undefeated seasons
Santa Clara Missionites football